Martina Navratilova defeated Chris Evert in the final, 6–7(4–7), 6–4, 7–5 to win the women's singles tennis title at the 1981 Australian Open. It was her first Australian Open singles title and third major singles title overall.

Hana Mandlíková was the defending champion, but was defeated in the quarterfinals by Evert.

Seeds
The seeded players are listed below. Martina Navratilova is the champion; others show the round in which they were eliminated.

  Chris Evert (finalist)
  Tracy Austin (quarterfinals)
  Martina Navratilova (champion)
  Andrea Jaeger (quarterfinals)
  Hana Mandlíková (quarterfinals)
  Pam Shriver (semifinals)
  Wendy Turnbull (semifinals)
  Evonne Goolagong (quarterfinals)
  Barbara Potter (second round)
  Mima Jaušovec (third round)
  Virginia Ruzici (first round)
  Bettina Bunge (third round)
  Sue Barker (third round)
  Kathy Jordan (third round)

Qualifying

Draw

Key
 Q = Qualifier
 WC = Wild card
 LL = Lucky loser
 r = Retired

Finals

Earlier rounds

Section 1

Section 2

Section 3

Section 4

See also
 Evert–Navratilova rivalry

External links
 1981 Australian Open – Women's draws and results at the International Tennis Federation

Women's singles
Australian Open (tennis) by year – Women's singles
Australian Open – Women's Singles